The 1970 Pacific Southwest Open was a combined men's and women's tennis tournament played on outdoor hard courts at the Los Angeles Tennis Club in Los Angeles, California in the United States. The men's tournament was part of the Grand Prix tennis circuit. It was the 44th edition of the tournament and ran from September 21 through September 27, 1970. Rod Laver and Sharon Walsh won the singles titles.

Finals

Men's singles

 Rod Laver defeated  John Newcombe 4–6, 6–4, 7–6(7–5)

Women's singles
 Sharon Walsh defeated  Lesley Hunt 6–3, 6–2

Men's doubles

 Tom Okker /  Marty Riessen defeated  Bob Lutz /  Stan Smith 7–6, 6–2

Women's doubles
 Janet Newberry /  Sharon Walsh defeated  Esmé Emmanuel /  Cecilia Martinez 6–3, 6–4

References

External links
 ITF tournament edition details (men)

Los Angeles Open (tennis)
Pacific Southwest Open
Pacific Southwest Open
Pacific Southwest Open
Pacific Southwest Open